Sir Adolphus William Ward  (2 December 1837 – 19 June 1924) was an English historian and man of letters.

Life
Ward was born at Hampstead, London, the son of John Ward. He was educated in Germany and at Peterhouse, Cambridge.

In 1866, Ward was appointed professor of history and English literature in Owens College, Manchester, and was principal from 1890 to 1897, when he retired. He took an active part in the foundation of Victoria University, of which he was vice-chancellor from 1886 to 1890 and from 1894 to 1896, and he was a founder of Withington Girls' School in 1890. He was a Member of the Chetham Society, serving as a member of council from 1884 and as president from 1901 until 1915.

In 1897, the freedom of the city of Manchester was conferred upon him, he delivered the Ford Lectures at the University of Oxford in 1898, and on 29 October 1900 he was elected master of Peterhouse, Cambridge.

He was elected in 1903 a fellow of the British Academy and was the academy's president from 1911 to 1913. In 1919 he delivered the British Academy's Shakespeare Lecture.

Ward served as president of the Royal Historical Society from 1899 to 1901, and he was knighted in 1913.

Works
Ward's major work is his standard History of English Dramatic Literature to the Age of Queen Anne (1875), re-edited after a thorough revision in three volumes in 1899. He also wrote The House of Austria in the Thirty Years' War (1869), Great Britain and Hanover: Some Aspects of the Personal Union (1899), and The Electress Sophia and the Hanoverian Succession (1903) (2nd ed. 1909). His Germany, 1815–1890 has three volumes.

Ward edited George Crabbe's Poems (2 vols., 1905–1906) and Alexander Pope's Poetical Works (1869); he wrote the volumes on Geoffrey Chaucer and Charles Dickens in the "English Men of Letters" series, translated Ernst Curtius's History of Greece (5 vols., 1868–1873); with G. W. Prothero and Stanley Mordaunt Leathes he edited the Cambridge Modern History between 1901 and 1912, and with A. R. Waller edited the Cambridge History of English Literature (1907, etc.).

Ward's collected papers were published in 5 volumes by Cambridge University Press in 1921.

Notes

External links 

 
 
 
 Chetham Society

1837 births
1924 deaths
19th-century English historians
Fellows of Peterhouse, Cambridge
Alumni of Peterhouse, Cambridge
Academics of the Victoria University of Manchester
Masters of Peterhouse, Cambridge
Fellows of the Royal Historical Society
Chaucer scholars
Presidents of the British Academy
Presidents of the Royal Historical Society
Vice-Chancellors of the Victoria University of Manchester
Vice-Chancellors of the University of Cambridge
Knights Bachelor
Fellows of the British Academy
Manchester Literary and Philosophical Society
Chetham Society
20th-century English historians